Pelocoris biimpressus is a species of creeping water bug in the family Naucoridae. It is found in North America and has two subspecies: P. biimpressus biimpressus and P. biimpressus shoshone.

References

Insects described in 1898
Naucoridae